Bassarona dunya, the great marquis, is a butterfly of the family Nymphalidae. It is found in South-East Asia.

Subspecies
Bassarona dunya dunya (southern Burma to Peninsular Malaya)
Bassarona dunya mahara Fruhstorfer (Java)
Bassarona dunya manaya Fruhstorfer (Sumatra)
Bassarona dunya monara Fruhstorfer (Borneo and possibly Palawan)
Bassarona dunya saidja (van de Poll, 1895) (Nias)

References

Bassarona
Butterflies of Borneo
Butterflies of Java
Butterflies described in 1848